The 2017 Fresno State Bulldogs football team represented California State University, Fresno in the 2017 NCAA Division I FBS football season. The Bulldogs were led by first-year head coach Jeff Tedford and played their home games at Bulldog Stadium as a member of the Mountain West Conference in the West Division. They finished the season 10–4, 7–1 in Mountain West play to win the West Division. They lost to Mountain Division champion Boise State in the Mountain West Championship Game. They were invited to the Hawaii Bowl where they defeated Houston.  They became only the second team in college football history to win ten games the year after they lost ten or more games (1–11 in 2016).

In a twist of irony, Tedford, who was the head coach at California from 2002 to 2011, took over for Tim DeRuyter, who was hired to be the defensive coordinator at California for the 2017 season.

Personnel

Position key

Recruiting class
The Bulldogs signed a total of 23 recruits.

Schedule

Schedule Source: 2017 Fresno State Bulldogs Football Schedule

Rankings

Game summaries

Incarnate Word

at Alabama

at Washington

Nevada

at San Jose State

New Mexico

at San Diego State

UNLV

BYU

at Hawaii

at Wyoming

Boise State

at Boise State (Mountain West Championship Game)

vs Houston (Hawaii Bowl)

References

Fresno State
Fresno State Bulldogs football seasons
Hawaii Bowl champion seasons
Fresno State Bulldogs football